Iain Mackay (born 24 April 1985) is a British field hockey player. At the 2012 Summer Olympics, he competed for the national team in the tournament.

Club career
MacKay played club hockey with Reading but left after the Olympics to join Hampstead & Westminster.

International career
MacKay began playing internationally in 2009 and helped England to a win in the 2009 Men's EuroHockey Nations Championship.

Personal life
He was schooled at Bishop's Stortford College, Hertfordshire. Later, he attended college at Loughborough University.

References

External links
 
 
 
 

Living people
English male field hockey players
Field hockey players at the 2012 Summer Olympics
Olympic field hockey players of Great Britain
British male field hockey players
1985 births
Hampstead & Westminster Hockey Club players
Reading Hockey Club players
Loughborough Students field hockey players
2010 Men's Hockey World Cup players